"Back to School (Mini Maggit)" is a song by American alternative metal band Deftones. It is an altered version of the song "Pink Maggit" from the band's 2000 album White Pony. Shortly after the album's initial release, in a contentious move by the band's label Maverick, it was re-released with "Back to School (Mini Maggit)" added on.

"Back to School (Mini Maggit)" was released as both a single and as an EP package; the single was released shortly before the EP.

Background

Vocalist Chino Moreno has said, "This album right here [the White Pony re-release] is not the album that we turned in to the label. As far as we're concerned, the first edition was the record. Done. Then, they talked us into re-releasing it with another song on it, and it's not like I'm against the song or whatever, but I liked the sequence we had when we first turned it in. When this version came out, a little part inside all of us felt like: 'Fuck! We just totally compromised.' And I know that a lot of our fans felt bad about it too."

The band also specifically regretted the presence of "Back to School" on the re-release of the album, as Moreno stated in an interview with German rock magazine Visions: "'Back to School' was a mistake. A calculated song, that had been built up with only one aim in mind: It should be a single. ... 'Back to School' was released because I was an idiot. I wanted to prove something [to the record company]. Months later, after White Pony was released, they wanted us to do a new version of "Pink Maggit". They said we lost our heaviness, and there were no more singles on the album. First, I wanted to stick this idea up my ass, but then I thought: 'I'm gonna show those fuckers how easy it is to create a hit-single.' And so I rapped a hip hop part on that song, we shortened it and half an hour later, the hit-single was ready to roll on."

Track listing

Charts

References

Deftones songs
Music videos directed by Paul Hunter (director)
2000 songs
Maverick Records singles
Song recordings produced by Terry Date
Songs written by Stephen Carpenter
Songs written by Chi Cheng (musician)
Songs written by Abe Cunningham
Songs written by Chino Moreno
Rap rock songs
2000 singles